Yurd Sukhteh (also Romanized as Yūrd Sūkhteh; also known as Yard Sūkhteh) is a village in Falard Rural District, Falard District, Lordegan County, Chaharmahal and Bakhtiari Province, Iran. At the 2006 census, its population was 130, in 20 families. The village is populated by Lurs.

References 

Populated places in Lordegan County
Luri settlements in Chaharmahal and Bakhtiari Province